The 1923–24 Northern Rugby Football League season was the 29th season of rugby league football.

Season summary

Batley won their first, and to date only, Championship when they defeated Wigan 13–7 in the play-off Championship Final.

Wigan had ended the regular season as the league leaders and won the Challenge Cup by defeating Oldham 21–4 in the final.

Wigan won the Lancashire League, and Batley won the Yorkshire League. St Helens Recs beat Swinton 17–0 to win the Lancashire Cup, and Hull F.C. beat Huddersfield 10–4 to win the Yorkshire County Cup.

Championship

Championship playoff

Challenge Cup

Wigan beat Oldham 21–4 in the final played at Rochdale before a crowd of 41,381.

This was Wigan's first Challenge Cup Final Win in their second appearance in a Final.

References

Sources
1923-24 Rugby Football League season at wigan.rlfans.com
The Challenge Cup at The Rugby Football League website

1923 in English rugby league
1924 in English rugby league
Northern Rugby Football League seasons